Seddin station is a railway station in Neuseddin, district of the municipality Seddiner See located in the district of Potsdam-Mittelmark, Brandenburg, Germany. It is one of the most important classification yards of DB Netz in the eastern part of Germany and belongs to the nine large train formation facilities of DB Cargo in Germany.

References

Railway stations in Brandenburg
Railway stations in Germany opened in 1914
1914 establishments in Prussia
Buildings and structures in Potsdam-Mittelmark